Abdelaziz Mohamed Sanqour Qambar Al-Mazam (born 7 May 1989) is an Emirati professional footballer. He plays as a full back for Shabab Al-Ahli and United Arab Emirates national football team. He has competed at the 2012 Summer Olympics.

International career

International goals
Scores and results list the United Arab Emirates' goal tally first.

Honours
United Arab Emirates
 Gulf Cup of Nations: 2013
AFC Asian Cup third-place: 2015

References

1989 births
Living people
Emirati footballers
United Arab Emirates international footballers
Olympic footballers of the United Arab Emirates
Footballers at the 2012 Summer Olympics
2015 AFC Asian Cup players
Sharjah FC players
Al Ahli Club (Dubai) players
Shabab Al-Ahli Club players
Al Wahda FC players
UAE Pro League players
Association football defenders
Asian Games medalists in football
Footballers at the 2010 Asian Games
Asian Games silver medalists for the United Arab Emirates
Medalists at the 2010 Asian Games